The Offaly Senior Hurling Championship (known for sponsorship reasons as the Molloy Environmental Senior Hurling Championship) is an annual hurling competition contested by top-tier Offaly GAA clubs. The Offaly County Board of the Gaelic Athletic Association has organised it since 1896.

Shinrone are the title holders (2022) defeating Kilcormac–Killoughey in the Final.

History
The title has been won at least once by 12 different teams. The all-time record-holders are Coolderry, who have won a total of 31 titles.

Since the beginning, the championship has been dominated by Coolderry, Birr, Drumcullen and St Rynagh's. They have won a combined total of 90 of the 124 championship titles. Coolderry dominated the first twenty years of the championship, winning eleven titles between 1889 and 1917. After this initial golden age, Coolderry regularly claimed championship titles in each of the following decades. After making their own breakthrough in 1908, Drumcullen went on to become the team of the decade during the 1920s after winning eight titles between 1918 and 1933. Tullamore and Birr subsequently came to the fore, winning eleven titles between them between 1932 and 1948.

Drumcullen enjoyed their most successful decade when they won seven championships between 1950 and 1960. This would be their last championship title. St Rynagh's inscribed their name on the roll of honour for the first time in 1965. They became the preeminent team of the next three decades and won 16 championship titles between 1965 and 1993. By this stage Birr had begun their own golden era. After winning their first championship in twenty years in 1991, the club went on to claim eleven more titles between then and 2008.

Format
The series of games are played during the spring, summer and autumn months with the county final currently being played at O'Connor Park in November. The prize for the winning team is the Seán Robbins Cup. Initially played as a knock-out competition, the championship currently features a group stage followed by a knock-out stage.

Current teams

The 10 teams competing in the 2022 Offaly Senior Hurling Championship are:

Ballinamere

Belmont

Birr

Clodiagh Gaels

Coolderry

Kilcormac–Killoughey
 
Kinnitty

Seir Kieran

Shinrone

St Rynagh's Hurling Club

Honours

The winning team is presented with the Seán Robbins Cup. A native of Birr, Robbins served two terms as county chairman and served as Leinster Council chairman. He was also a president of the county board and was also a prominent referee at All-Ireland AND Leinster levels. The cup was first presented in 1960.

The Offaly Senior Hurling Championship winners qualify for the subsequent Leinster Senior Club Hurling Championship. This place is reserved for club teams only as divisional and amalgamated teams are not allowed in the provincial championship.

The Offaly County Championship is an integral part of the wider Leinster Senior Club Hurling Championship. The winners of the Offaly county final join the champions of the other hurling counties to contest the provincial championship.

List of finals
(r) = replay

Wins listed by club

Records and statistics

Managers
Managers in the Offaly Championship are involved in the day-to-day running of the team, including the training, team selection, and sourcing of players. Their influence varies from club-to-club and is related to the individual club committees. The manager is assisted by a team of two or three selectors and a backroom team consisting of various coaches.

Teams

By decade

The most successful team of each decade, judged by the number of Offaly Senior Hurling Championship titles, is as follows:

 1890s: 2 for Killoughey (1896–97)
 1900s: 5 for Coolderry (1901-03-04-05-06)
 1910s: 5 for Coolderry (1910-11-14-16-17)
 1920s: 5 for Drumcullen (1924-25-27-28-29)
 1930s: 5 for Tullamore (1932-34-35-36-37)
 1940s: 5 for Birr (1940-43-44-46-48)
 1950s: 6 for Drumcullen (1950-51-52-54-57-58)
 1960s: 4 for St Rynagh's (1965-66-68-69)
 1970s: 6 for St Rynagh's (1970-72-73-74-75-76)
 1980s: 3 each for St Rynagh's (1981-82-87) and Kinnitty (1983-84-85)
 1990s: 4 for Birr (1991-94-97-99)
 2000s: 8 for Birr (2000-01-02-03-05-06-07-08)
 2010s: 4 for Kilcormac–Killoughey (2012-13-14-17) 4 for Coolderry (2010-11-15-18)

Gaps

Top ten longest gaps between successive championship titles:

 45 years: Tullamore (1964–2009)
 44 years: Kinnitty (1923–1967)
 23 years: Tullamore (1909–1932)
 23 years: Birr (1915–1938)
 23 years: Birr (1948–1971)
 23 years: St Rynagh's (1993–2016)
 20 years: Birr (1971–1991)
 18 years: Tullamore (1937–1955)
 18 years: Coolderry (1986–2004)
 14 years: Coolderry (1963–1977)

Top scorers

By year

References

External links
Official Offaly Website
Offaly on Hoganstand
Offaly Club GAA

 
Hurling competitions in Leinster
Offaly GAA club championships
Senior hurling county championships